Shahin Abdalla Abdulrahman S. Al-Maazmi (Arabic:شاهين عبد الرحمن) (born 16 November 1992) is an Emirati footballer. He currently plays as a defender for Al-Sharjah.

External links

References

Emirati footballers
1992 births
Living people
Sharjah FC players
UAE First Division League players
UAE Pro League players
Association football defenders